White Eagle(s) may refer to:

History and politics
 Coat of arms of Poland, a white eagle
 Crusade of Romanianism, or White Eagles, a 1930s far-right movement in Romania
 Task Force White Eagle, a Polish military unit during the War in Afghanistan 2002–2021
 White Eagles (paramilitary), a 1990s Serbian paramilitary group

Film
 White Eagle (1922 serial), an American Western film serial
 The White Eagle, a 1928 Soviet silent drama film
 White Eagle (1932 film), an American Western directed by Lambert Hillyer
 White Eagle (1941 film), an Argentine drama directed by Carlos Hugo Christensen
 White Eagle (1941 serial), an American film serial based on the 1932 film
 White Eagle (1942 film), a Polish film of the 1940s
 White Eagle Enterprises, a film production company founded by Sylvester Stallone

Sports
 Bonnyrigg White Eagles FC, an Australian soccer club based in Bonnyrigg
 Dianella White Eagles SC, an Australian soccer club based in Perth
 New Town Eagles SC, originally White Eagle, an Australian soccer club based in Hobart
 Serbian White Eagles FC, a Canadian soccer team based in Toronto
 Springvale White Eagles FC, an Australian soccer club based in Melbourne

Structures
 White Eagle Hall, a venue in Jersey City, New Jersey, US
 White Eagle Museum, a Polish military museum in Skarżysko-Kamienna, Świętokrzyskie Voivodeship
 The White Eagle School, in Devpur Jakhwali, Gujarat, India

Other uses
 Chief White Eagle (c. 1825–1914), Native American chief of the Ponca, politician, and civil rights leader
 White Eagle (album), a 1982 album by Tangerine Dream
 White Eagle (Twilight: 2000), a 1990 tabletop game adventure
 White Eagle, Oklahoma, US, an unincorporated community
 White Eagle Aviation, a Polish airline
 The White Eagle Lodge, a spiritual organization in England

See also
 Order of the White Eagle (disambiguation)
 White-tailed eagle, a large bird of prey
 Aguila Blanca (disambiguation)
 Serbia national football team, nicknamed the Beli Orlovi (White Eagles)
 Beli Orlovi (supporter group), organized supporters of Serbian sport, especially of the Serbia national football team